Anoctamin-1 (ANO1) also known as Transmembrane member 16A (TMEM16A) is a protein that, in humans, is encoded by the ANO1 gene. Anoctamin-1 is a voltage-gated calcium-activated anion channel, which acts as a chloride channel and a bicarbonate channel. additionally Anoctamin-1 is apical iodide channel.
It is expressed in smooth muscle, epithelial cells, vomeronasal neurons, olfactory sustentacular cells, and is highly expressed in interstitial cells of Cajal (ICC) throughout the gastrointestinal tract.

Function 

ANO1 is a transmembrane protein that functions as a calcium-activated chloride channel. Ca2+, Sr2+, and Ba2+ activate the channel.

Structure 
No atomic resolution structure of this channel has yet been obtained. However, biochemical evidence suggests that the channel assembles as a dimer of two ANO1 polypeptide subunits. From hydropathy plotting, each subunit is thought to encode a molecule with eight transmembrane domains, with a reentrant loop between the fifth and sixth transmembrane domains. The reentrant loop is thought to be a P loop-like structure responsible for the ion selectivity of the protein.

Clinical significance 

In mice, the functional expression of the ANO1 channel is essential to life, as its absence leads to a premature death due to respiratory collapse.

ANO1 is expressed in the gastrointestinal tract and is highly expressed in interstitial cells of Cajal, where it plays an important role in pacemaker activity, neurotransduction of enteric motor neurotransmitters and regulation of gastrointestinal motility. ANO1 blockers like niflumic acid have been shown to block slow waves, which produce phasic contractions and the major patterns of gastrointestinal motility, such as peristalsis and segmentation. ANO1-knockout mice fail to produce slow waves altogether. Carbachol has been shown to markedly activate the channel due to its effect on release of Ca2+ from intracellular stores. ANO1 activation is necessary for normal function of ICC and generation of normal patterns of activity in smooth muscles of the gastrointestinal tract.

Its overexpression was reported in esophageal squamous cell carcinoma and breast cancer progression.

References

Further reading

External links 
 

Chloride channels